IgniteFusion is a freeware CFML script engine that runs cfm script files. Similar to Perl or PHP script
engines the IgniteFusion script engine runs as an executable on the server.
Other CFML engines include Adobe ColdFusion, New Atlanta BlueDragon, Railo, Lucee, and Coral Web Builder.

See also 
ColdFusion

CFML compilers
CFML programming language